ViSta, the Visual Statistics system is a freeware statistical system developed by Forrest W. Young of the University of North Carolina.

ViSta incorporates a number of special features that are of both theoretical and practical interest: The workmap keeps record of the datasets opened by the user and the subsequent statistical transformations and analysis applied to them. Spreadplots show all the relevant plots for a dataset with a given combination of types of variables. Graphics are the primary way of output in contrast with traditional statistics packages where the textual output is more important.

References

 Young, F. W., Valero-Mora, P. M. & Friendly, M. (2006) Visual Statistics: Seeing Data with Interactive Graphics. Wiley  
 Meissner, W. (2008) Book review of "Visual Statistics: Seeing Data with Interactive Graphics". Psychometrika 73, 1. Springer.
 ViSta is mentioned in  Michael Friendly's Milestones of Statistical Graphics

External links
 This site keeps the last version of ViSta and other information 
 The original site for ViSta with old versions and documentation 
 Some Plug-ins to extend the ViSta's analysis options 
 Current version is 7.9.2.8 (2014, March) 

Statistical software